Minuscule 270 (in the Gregory-Aland numbering), ε 291 (Soden), is a Greek minuscule manuscript of the New Testament, on parchment. Paleographically it has been assigned to the 12th century. The manuscript has complex contents.

Description 

The codex contains a complete text of the four Gospels on 346 parchment leaves. The text is written in one column per page, in 19 lines per page.

There is also a division according to the smaller Ammonian Sections (in Mark 234 sections, the last  in 16:9), with references to the Eusebian Canons (written below Ammonian Section numbers).

It contains prolegomena to the Gospel of John, Synaxarion, Menologion, and pictures.

Text 

The Greek text of the codex is a representative of the Byzantine text-type. Aland placed it in Category V.

According to the Claremont Profile Method it represents textual family Πb in Luke 1, family Πa in Luke 10 and Luke 20.

History 

The manuscript was added to the list of New Testament manuscripts by Scholz (1794–1852).

The manuscript was bought from Spyridion Lambros from Athens in 1859, along with 22 other manuscripts of the New Testament (codices: 269,  271, 272, 688, 689, 690, 691, 692, 693, etc.).

Scholz examined a large part of the manuscript. Minuscule 270 was examined by Dean Burgon. It was examined and described by Paulin Martin. C. R. Gregory saw the manuscript in 1885.

Formerly the manuscript was held in the library of St. Silvester in Rome. The manuscript is currently housed at the Bibliothèque nationale de France (Gr. 75) at Paris.

See also 

 List of New Testament minuscules
 Biblical manuscript
 Textual criticism

References

Further reading

External links 

 R. Waltz, Minuscule 270 at the Encyclopedia of Textual Criticism

Greek New Testament minuscules
12th-century biblical manuscripts
Bibliothèque nationale de France collections